The following list of Museums and Collections of the Baix Empordà region is related with the different museums and collections that exist in the Baix Empordà region.

Museums and collections

References

External links 
 Consell Comarcal del Baix Emporda - Museums
 Territorial network of museums in the counties of Girona
 Museums of the Costa Brava
 Network of Museums of Ethnology of Catalonia
 Netwoek of Maritime Museums of the Catalana Coast
 International Council of Museums
 International Council of Maritime Museums
 Association of Mediterranean Maritime Museums
 Espais Escrits. Catalan literary heritage network

Baix Empordà
Museums in Baix Empordà